Ruth Sanders Cordes (August 20, 1890 — February 11, 1968) was a top-level American amateur tennis player.

Born in Cincinnati, Ohio, she graduated from Hughes Center High School and from the University of Cincinnati in 1912.

She started her tennis career at the age 22, when she was talked into entering the singles draw at the prestigious Tri-State Championship at Cincinnati by her brother. Completely unknown and having only the UC Championship to her credit, she stunned the tennis world by defeating Elizabeth Bunce, the 1911 National Indoor Doubles champion from New York City, 6–2, 6–3, in the singles final, and then beating defending two-time champion Marjorie Dodd, one of the top players in the Midwest, by the same score in the Challenge Round.

Later at the important Bi-State Tournament in Louisville, she defeated Louisville champion Mary Schreve Lyons, 6–0, 6–1, in the finals.

Thereafter, and throughout her distinguished career from 1913 through 1923 (during which time she had children 1918, 1919 and 1921), she won numerous titles, the most important of which were singles, doubles and mixed doubles titles at the 1917 National Clay Court Championship, and five singles titles at the storied international tennis tournament in her hometown, now known as the Cincinnati Masters & Women's Open. Those titles came in 1913, ‘14, ‘20, ‘22 & ’23. She also won a doubles title (1911) at Cincinnati and reached two doubles finals (1915 & 1920) as well.

In an age before the Midwest had women's rankings, she was nonetheless considered the best by those in the know at the time. Against national-class players appearing in tournaments near her home, she defeated many and reportedly lost only twice: to the U.S. No. 5 ranked Louise Riddell Williams (Mrs. R.H. Williams), 6–1, 6–4, in the semifinals of the 1914 National Clay Court, and by Northwestern Champion Margaret Davis of St. Paul, 6–1, 5–7, 6–1, at Cincinnati in 1916. She was reportedly too ill to play that 1916 Cincinnati tournament, but played anyway just to please her friends.

The only time she was completely outclassed was when she lost to the then national champion and eventually Hall of Famer Molla Bjurstedt, 6–0, 6–4, in the Challenge Round at Cincinnati in 1915.

Unfortunately, her dislike of and refusal to travel long distances, necessary for national ranking consideration, prevented her earning several national "Top Ten" women's singles rankings.

Sanders married Howard F. Cordes on August 14, 1917, shortly after she and her groom won the National Clay Court Mixed Doubles Championship over nationally ranked teams in the semifinals and finals.

She was a grade school teacher in Cincinnati (in the neighborhood of North Fairmount) and later in life took up golf. She became one of the best amateur golfers in Cincinnati.

In 2003, she was posthumously inducted into the Cincinnati Tennis Hall of Fame.

References
From Club Court to Center Court by Phillip S. Smith (2008 Edition)

1890 births
1968 deaths
American female tennis players
Cincinnati Bearcats women's tennis players
Tennis players from Cincinnati
20th-century American women